Edward Bryzemejster (born 3 April 1877, date of death unknown) was a sailor from Poland, who represented his country at the 1924 Summer Olympics in Meulan, France.

References

Sources
 
 

1877 births
Year of death missing
Polish male sailors (sport)
Sailors at the 1924 Summer Olympics – Monotype
Olympic sailors of Poland
20th-century deaths
Place of birth missing